Secusio strigata is a moth in the subfamily Arctiinae. It was described by Francis Walker in 1854. It is found in Ethiopia, Kenya, Malawi, Somalia, South Africa, Tanzania, Uganda, Yemen, Zambia and India.

Subspecies
Secusio strigata strigata (Kenya, Malawi, South Africa, Uganda)
Secusio strigata parvipuncta Hampson, 1891 (Kenya, Tanzania, Yemen, India)
Secusio strigata yemenensis Wiltshire, 1983 (Yemen)

References

Moths described in 1854
Arctiini